Framboise River is an estuarine river in Cape Breton Island, Nova Scotia, Canada.

Course

The Framboise River (CAMVI) is an estuary that extends to the northwest from Seal Rocks and Framboise Cove on the coast to where Bagnells River (Bagnells Lake), Middle River Framboise and Northeast Framboise River converge.
Strachans Brook and Mary Anns Brook enter the estuary from the south.
The community of Framboise, Nova Scotia, lies to the southwest of the river.
"Framboise" means raspberry in French, and probably was given as a descriptive name by the early settlers.

Watershed

Lakes in the watershed include MacArthurs Lake and MacMullin Lake, which are connected by a channel.
MacArthurs Lake has been described as "a beautiful pond". 
The  Middle-River Framboise Wilderness Area is a relatively inaccessible protected area of wetlands, streams, lakes and well-defined and forested drumlins.

A deposit of ore containing zinc (9.55%), lead (2.28%) and copper (0.94%) was discovered in Strachans Brook in the 1890s.
The Stirling base metal deposit, or Mindamar Mine, was purchased by British Metals Corporation, which operated the mine between 1935 and 1938, discharging waste and unrecovered metals directly into the brook. 
The mine was reopened from 1952 to 1956, with the waste now impounded in a tailings pond.
There is a small deltaic fan at the mouth of the brook.
It is not clear whether the quality of water and sediments in the Frambois River have been degraded by the dispersal of the tailings.

Notes

Sources

Rivers of Nova Scotia